Scarey Tales is the fifth studio album by English gothic rock band The Danse Society, one of the founder members of the Post-Punk & Goth movement in the 80s released this mini album at the beginning of 2013. It was released in 2013, through the band's own record label, Society. The album was released in  a limited edition special book and CD, including lyrics and artwork to each song.

Track listing

Critical reception 

'Louder that War' said; "Scarey Tales is a celebration of the old tales that lead us into a greater understanding of our own natures. There can be no true self-awareness without an awareness of our own dark sides. Without death, life has no meaning". Chain D.L.K. said of the album; "The Danse Society with "Message In The Wind", "White Rabbit", "The Scarecrow", "The Tale", "The Wof" and "Jekyll & Hyde" are able to make you enter a world made of mystery and darkness. They do it mixing their elements with sorcerers' ability."

Personnel 

 Paul Gilmartin – drums
 Paul Nash – guitar,
 Maethelyiah – vocals
 David Whitaker – keyboards
 Martin Roberts - Bass

References

External links 
 The Danse Society official website
 Scarey Tales at Discogs

The Danse Society albums